from Fujimi, Nagano Prefecture, is a Japanese ski mountaineer, Alpine climber, and professional mountain cameraman. Hiraide has won the Piolet d'Or mountaineering award on three occasions.

Climbing career
Hiraide became a serious mountain climber after joining a mountaineering club at his university. In 2001, he reached the eastern summit of Kula Kangri (7,381m) in Tibet. His list of accomplishments includes first ascents, reaching summits without oxygen, and skiing from mountain peaks. In 2009, he scaled the previously unclimbed southeastern wall of Kamet (7,756m) in India, and with his climbing partner Kei Taniguchi, became the first Japanese to receive the 17th Piolet d'Or Award, the "Academy Award" of mountaineering. He also won two other Piolet d'Or Awards for his first ascent on an uncharted route with Shispare in 2017, and Rakaposhi in 2019. He also received the Japan Sports Award, sponsored by the Yomiuri Shimbun newspaper, in 2001 and 2009.

Selected results

Ski mountaineering 
 2009:
 1st, Asian Championship, relay (mixed team), together with Mase Chigaya, Sato Yoshiyuki and Suzuki Keiichiro
 4th, Asian Championship, individual
 5th, Asian Championship, vertical race

Mountain climbing 
 2001 
 Kula Kangri East Peak (7381m), Pakistan, first ascent
 Cho Oyu (8201m) China, summit, ski down from top
 2003
 Kunyang Chhish (7852m), Pakistan, first try, west face
 2004
 Golden Peak (7027m), Pakistan, new route, north west ridge, summit
 Lila Peak (6200m), Pakistan, new route, east face, summit
 Kunlun Mustag (6355m), China, new route, summit
 2005
 Mustag Ata (7564m), China, second ascent, east ridge, summit, ski down to west side
 Shivling (6543m), India, new route, north face to west face, summit
 2007
 Shispare (7611m), Pakistan, first try, north east face
 2008
 Gasherbrum II (8035m), Pakistan, summit
 Broad Peak (8047), Pakistan, summit
 Kamet (7756m), India, new route, south east face, summit
 2009
 Gasherbrum I (8068m), Pakistan, Summit
 Gaurishankar (7134m), China, first try, east face
 2010
 Ama Dablam (6856m), Nepal, first try, north west face
 2011
 Everest (8848m), Nepal, south side, summit
 Naimonanyi (7694m), China, new route, south west ridge, summit, south peak (7200m), first ascent, first try, south east face
 2012
 Khan Tengri (7010m), Kazakh, north side, summit
 Shispare (7611m), Pakistan, first try, south west face
 2013
 Everest (8848m), Nepal, summit
 Diran (7266m), Pakistan, west ridge, summit
 Shispare (7611m), Pakistan, first try, south west face
 2014
 Everest (8848m), Nepal, south side
 Hkakabo Razi (5881m), Myanmar, first try, north ridge
 2015
 Everest (8848m), China, north side
 Api (7132m), Nepal, north side, summit
 2016
 Everest (8848m), China, north side, summit
 2017
 Shispare (7611m), Pakistan, new route, north east face
 2019
 Rakaposhi (7788m), Pakistan, new route, south face

Awards 
 2017: The 26th Piolet d'Or Award and The 12th Piolet d'Or Asia Award, together with Kenro Nakajima for the first ascent of the North-East face of Shispare (7611m, Pakistan) in alpine style.
 2019: The 28th Piolet d'Or Award, together with Kenro Nakajima for the first ascent of the south face of Rakaposhi (7788m, Pakistan) in alpine style.

External links 
 Kazuya Hiraide, Skimountaineering.org
 Hiraide , Ishii sports group

References 

1979 births
Living people
Japanese male ski mountaineers
Japanese mountain climbers
Sportspeople from Nagano Prefecture
Piolet d'Or winners